The 2015 ITF Women's Circuit – Hong Kong was a professional tennis tournament played on outdoor hard courts. It was the first edition of the tournament which is part of the 2015 ITF Women's Circuit, offering a total of $50,000 in prize money. It took place in Hong Kong, on 5–11 January 2015.

Singles entrants

Seeds 

 1 Rankings as of 29 December 2014

Other entrants 
The following players received wildcards into the singles main draw:
  Eudice Chong
  Ki Yan-tung
  Maggie Ng
  Wu Ho-ching

The following players received entry from the qualifying draw:
  Han Na-lae
  Hsu Chieh-yu
  Jang Su-jeong
  Makoto Ninomiya

Champions

Singles 

  Misaki Doi def.  Zhang Kailin, 6–3, 6–3

Doubles 

  Han Xinyun /  Hsu Chieh-yu def.  Varatchaya Wongteanchai /  Varunya Wongteanchai, 3–6, 6–4, [10–8]

External links 
 2015 ITF Women's Circuit – Hong Kong at ITFtennis.com
 Official website 

2015 ITF Women's Circuit
2015 in Hong Kong women's sport
Tennis tournaments in Hong Kong